Eriochilus scaber is a plant in the orchid family Orchidaceae and is endemic to Western Australia. It has a single leaf and up to three small red, pink and white flowers. Two subspecies are recognised based on the shape of the leaf and its height above the ground.

Description
Eriochilus scaber is a terrestrial,  perennial, deciduous, herb with an underground tuber and a single glabrous, yellowish green leaf which is egg-shaped to almost round. Flowering occurs from July to September.

Taxonomy and naming
Eriochilus scaber was first formally described in 1840 by John Lindley and the description was published in A Sketch of the Vegetation of the Swan River Colony. The specific epithet (scaber) is a Latin word meaning "rough" or "scurfy", referring to the surface of the labellum.

There are two subspecies:
 Eriochilus scaber subsp. orbifolius, commonly known as the round-leafed bunny orchid, which has an almost circular leaf held close to the ground.

Distribution and habitat
This bunny orchid grows in winter-wet areas between Jurien Bay and the Cape Arid National Park. Subspecies orbifolius is restricted to a small area of old sand dunes near Walpole.

Conservation
Eriochilus scaber subsp. scaber is classified as "not threatened" but subspecies orbifolius is classified as "Priority Two" by the Western Australian Government Department of Parks and Wildlife meaning that it is poorly known and from only one or a few locations.</ref>

References

scaber
Orchids of Western Australia
Endemic orchids of Australia
Plants described in 1840
Endemic flora of Western Australia
Taxa named by Stephen Hopper